Madonna and Child is a painting in oils on canvas of 1496–1499 by Cima da Conegliano. Previously in the L. M. and K. L. Kochubey collection, it was seized by the Soviet Union's State Museum Fund and in 1921 was handed to the Hermitage Museum in Saint Petersburg, where it still hangs.

Variants
Unusually for the artist, who usually produced unique works, this one seems to belong to a group of at least five works produced from a single cartoon:

References

1490s paintings
Paintings in the collection of the Hermitage Museum
Saint Petersburg